Pakistani nationalism refers to the political, cultural, linguistic, historical, [commonly] religious and geographical expression of patriotism by the people of Pakistan, of pride in the history, heritage and identity of Pakistan, and visions for its future.

Unlike the secular nationalism of most other countries, Pakistani nationalism is religious in nature of being the nationalism for the culture, traditions, languages and historical region that makes up Pakistan, inhabited by mostly Muslims. The culture, languages, literature, history of the region along with influence of Islam was the basis of Pakistani nationalist narrative. (see Secularism in Pakistan)

From a political point of view and in the years leading up to the independence of Pakistan, the particular political and ideological foundations for the actions of the Muslim League can be called a Pakistani nationalist ideology. It is a singular combination of philosophical, nationalistic, cultural and religious elements.

National consciousness in Pakistan

Muslim League separatist campaign in Colonial India

The roots of Pakistani nationalism lie in the separatist campaign of the Muslim League in British India, which sought to create a new state for Indian Muslims called Pakistan, on the basis of Islam. This concept of a separate state for India's Muslims traces its roots to Allama Iqbal, who has retroactively been dubbed the national poet of Pakistan. Iqbal was elected president of the Muslim League in 1930 at its session in Allahabad in the United Provinces, as well as for the session in Lahore in 1932. In his presidential address on 29 December 1930 he outlined a vision of an independent state for Muslim-majority provinces in north-western India:

For a large majority of the Muslim intelligentsia, including Iqbal, Indo-Muslim culture became a rallying ground for making the case for a separate Muslim homeland. The concept of Indo-Muslim culture was based on the development of a separate political and cultural identity during Muslim rule which built upon the merging of Persian and Indic languages, literature and arts. According to Iqbal, the uppermost purpose of establishing a separate country was the preservation of the Muslim "cultural entity", which he believed would not be safe under the rule of the Hindu majority. Syed Ahmed Khan, the grandson of the Mughal Vizier, Dabir-ud-Daulah, emphasized that Muslims and Hindus made up two different nations on the basis that Hindus were not ready to accept the contemporary Muslim culture and tradition which was exemplified by Hindu opposition to the Urdu language.

The assumption of the Muslims of India of belonging to a separate identity, and therefore, having a right to their own country, also rested on their pre-eminent claim to political power, which flowed from the experience of Muslim dominance in India.

Historians such as Shashi Tharoor maintain that the British government's divide-and-rule policies in India were established after witnessing Hindus and Muslims joining forces together to fight against Company rule in India during the Indian Rebellion of 1857. The demand for the creation of Pakistan as a homeland for Indian Muslims, according to many academics, was orchestrated mainly by the elite class of Muslims in colonial India primarily based in the United Provinces (U.P.) and Bihar who supported the All India Muslim League, rather the common Indian Muslim. 
In the colonial Indian province of Sind, the historian Ayesha Jalal describes the actions that Jinnah's pro-separatist Muslim League used in order to spread communal division and undermine the government of Allah Bakhsh Soomro, which stood for a united India:

The Muslim League, seeking to spread religious strife, "monetarily subsidized" mobs that engaged in communal violence against Hindus and Sikhs in the areas of Multan, Rawalpindi, Campbellpur, Jhelum and Sargodha, as well as in the Hazara District. Jinnah and the Muslim League's communalistic Direct Action Day in Calcutta resulted in 4,000 deaths and 100,000 residents left homeless in just 72 hours, sowing the seeds for riots in other provinces and the eventual partition of the country.

The Ahmadiyya Muslim Jama'at staunchly supported Jinnah's separatist demand for Pakistan. Chaudary Zafarullah Khan, an Ahmadi leader, drafted the Lahore Resolution that separatist leaders interpreted as calling for the creation of Pakistan. Chaudary Zafarullah Khan was asked by Jinnah to represent the Muslim League to the Radcliffe Commission, which was charged with drawing the line between an independent India and newly created Pakistan. Ahmadis argued to try to ensure that the city of Qadian, India would fall into the newly created state of Pakistan, though they were unsuccessful in doing so. Upon the creation of Pakistan, many Ahmadis held prominent posts in government positions; in the Indo-Pakistani War of 1947–1948, in which Pakistan tried to invade and capture the state of Jammu and Kashmir, the Ahmadiyya Muslim Jama'at created the Furqan Force to fight Indian troops.

In the first decade after Pakistan gained independence after the partition of India, "Pakistan considered its history to be a part of larger India's, a common history, a joint history, and in fact Indian textbooks were in use in the syllabus in Pakistan." The government under Ayub Khan, however, wished to rewrite the history of Pakistan to exclude any reference India and tasked the historians within Pakistan to manufacture a nationalist narrative of a "separate" history that erased the country's Indian past. Elizabeth A. Cole of the George Mason University Jimmy and Rosalynn Carter School for Peace and Conflict Resolution noted that Pakistani textbooks eliminate the country's Hindu and Buddhist past, while referring to Muslims as a monolithic entity and focusing solely on the advent of Islam in the Indian subcontinent. During the rule of General Muhammad Zia-ul-Haq a "program of Islamization" of the country including the textbooks was started. General Zia's 1979 education policy stated that "[the] highest priority would be given to the revision of the curricula with a view to reorganizing the entire content around Islamic thought and giving education an ideological orientation so that Islamic ideology permeates the thinking of the younger generation and helps them with the necessary conviction and ability to refashion society according to Islamic tenets". According to Pakistan Studies curriculum, Muhammad bin Qasim is often referred to as the first Pakistani despite having been alive several centuries before its creation through the partition of India in 1947. Muhammad Ali Jinnah also acclaimed the Pakistan movement to have started when the first Muslim put a foot in the Gateway of Islam and that Bin Qasim is actually the founder of Pakistan.

Pakistan as inheritor state to Islamic political powers in medieval India
Some Pakistani nationalists state that Pakistan is the successor state of Islamic empires and kingdoms that ruled medieval India for almost a combined period of one millennium, the empires and kingdoms in order are the Abbasid Caliphate, Ghaznavid Empire, Ghorid Kingdom, Delhi Sultanate, Deccan sultanates and Mughal Empire. This history of Muslim rule in the subcontinent composes possibly the largest segment of Pakistani nationalism.

To this end, many Pakistani nationalists claim monuments like the Taj Mahal, located in Agra, which was built by Ustad Ahmad Lahori, an ethnic Punjabi Muslim, as being Pakistani and part of Pakistan's history. The Red Fort, and the Jama Masjid, Delhi are also claimed by Pakistani nationalists as belonging to Pakistanis.

Syed Ahmed Khan and the Indian Rebellion of 1857
See also: Syed Ahmed Khan, Indian rebellion of 1857

Syed Ahmed Khan, the grandson of the Mughal Vizier, Dabir-ud-Daula, believed that Muslims and Hindus belonged to two separate nations. He promoted Western-style education in Muslim society, seeking to uplift Muslims economically and politically in British India. He founded the Aligarh Muslim University, then called the Anglo-Oriental College.

In 1835 Lord Macaulay's minute recommending that Western rather than Oriental learning predominate in the East India Company's education policy had led to numerous changes. In place of Arabic and Persian, the Western languages, history and philosophy were taught at state-funded schools and universities whilst religious education was barred. English became not only the medium of instruction but also the official language in 1835 in place of Persian, disadvantaging those who had built their careers around the latter language. Traditional Islamic studies were no longer supported by the state, and some madrasahs lost their waqf or endowment. The Indian rebellion of 1857 is held by nationalists to have ended in disaster for the Muslims, as Bahadur Shah Zafar, the last Mughal, was deposed. Power over the subcontinent was passed from the East India Company to the British Crown. The removal of the last symbol of continuity with the Mughal period spawned a negative attitude amongst some Muslims towards everything modern and western, and a disinclination to make use of the opportunities available under the new regime. As Muslims were generally agriculturists and soldiers, while Hindus were increasingly seen as successful financiers and businessmen, the historian Spear noted that to the Muslim "an industrialized India meant a Hindu India".

Seeing this atmosphere of despair and despondency, Syed launched his attempts to revive the spirit of progress within the Muslim community of India. He was convinced that the Muslims, in their attempt to regenerate themselves, had failed to realise that mankind had entered a very important phase of its existence, i.e., an era of science and learning. He knew that the realisation of that was the source of progress and prosperity for the British. Therefore, modern education became the pivot of his movement for regeneration of the Indian Muslims. He tried to transform the Muslim outlook from a mediaeval one to a modern one. Syed's first and foremost objective was to acquaint the British with the Indian mind; his next goal was to open the minds of his countrymen to European literature, science and technology. Therefore, in order to attain these goals, Syed launched the Aligarh Movement, of which Aligarh was the center. He had two immediate objectives in mind: to remove the state of misunderstanding and tension between the Muslims and the new British government, and to induce them to go after the opportunities available under the new regime without deviating in any way from the fundamentals of their faith.

Syed Ahmed Khan converted the existing cultural and religious entity among Indian Muslims into a separatist political force, throwing a Western cloak of nationalism over the Islamic concept of culture. The distinct sense of value, culture and tradition among Indian Muslims, which originated from the nature of Islamization of the Indian populace during the Muslim conquests in the Indian subcontinent, was used for a separatist identity leading to the Pakistan Movement.

Independence of Pakistan

In the Indian rebellion of 1857, both Hindu and Muslims fought the forces allied with the British Empire in different parts of British India. The war's spark arose because the British attacked the "Beastly customs of Indians" by forcing the Indian sepoys to handle Enfield P-53 gun cartridges greased with lard taken from slaughtered pigs and tallow taken from slaughtered cows. The cartridges had to bitten open to use the gunpowder, effectively meaning that sepoys would have to bite the lard and tallow. This was a manifestation of the insensitivity that the British exhibited to Muslim and Hindu religious traditions, such as the rejection of pork consumption in Islam and the rejection of slaughter of cow in Hinduism. There were also some kingdoms and peoples who supported the British. This event laid the foundation not only for a nationwide expression, but also future nationalism and conflict on religious and ethnic terms.

The desire among some for a new state for the Indian Muslims, or Azadi was born with Kernal Sher Khan, who looked to Muslim history and heritage, and condemned the fact Muslims were ruled by the British Empire and not by Muslim leaders. The idea of complete independence did not catch on until after World War I, when the British government reduced civil liberties with the Rowlatt Acts of 1919. When General Reginal Dyer ordered the Jallianwala Bagh Massacre in Amritsar, Punjab which took place in the same year, the Muslim public was outraged and most of the Muslim political leaders turned against the British government. Pakistan was finally actualized through the partition of India in 1947 on the basis of Two Nation Theory. Today, Pakistan is divided into 4 provinces. The last census recorded the 1981 population at 84.3 million, nearly double the 1961 figure of 42.9 million. By 1983, the population had tripled to nearly 93 million, making Pakistan the world's 9th most populous country, although in area it ranked 34th.

Pakistani nationalist symbols

Because of the country's identity with Islam, mosques like Badshahi Mosque and Faisal Mosque are also used as national symbols either to represent "glorious past" or modernistic future. Pakistan has many shrines, sights, sounds and symbols that have significance to Pakistani nationalists. These include the Shrines of Political leaders of pre-independence and post-independence Pakistan, Shrines of Religious leaders and Saints, The Shrines of Imperial leaders of various Islamic Empires and Dynasties, as well as national symbols of Pakistan. Some of these shrines, sights and symbols have become a places of Pilgrimage for Pakistani ultra-nationalism and militarism, as well as for obviously religious purposes.

The older ten rupee notes of the Pakistani rupee included background images of the remains of Mohenjo-daro and Harappa. In the 1960s, the imagery of Gandharan and Greco-Buddhist artefacts were unearthed in Pakistan, and some Pakistani nationalists "creatively imagined" an ancient civilisation which differentiated the provinces now lying in Pakistan from the rest of the Indian subcontinent, which is not accepted by mainstream historians; they tried to emphasize its contacts with the West and framed Gandharan Buddhism as antithetical to 'Brahmin' (Hindu) influence.

Nationalism and politics

The political identity of the Pakistani Armed Forces, Pakistan's largest institution and one which controlled the government for over half the history of modern-day Pakistan and still does, is reliant on the connection to Pakistan's Imperial past. The Pakistan Muslim League's fortunes up till the 1970s were propelled by its legacy as the flagship of Pakistan's Independence Movement, and the core platform of the party today evokes that past, considering itself to be the guardian of Pakistan's freedom, democracy and unity as well as religion. Other parties have arisen, such as Pakistan Peoples Party, once advocating a leftist program and now more centrist. Nationally, the ruling Pakistan Peoples Party (PPP) is weak. In contrast, the Muttahida Majlis-e-Amal employs a more aggressively theocratic nationalistic expression. The MMA seeks to defend the culture and heritage of Pakistan and the majority of its people, the Muslim population. It ties theocratic nationalism with the aggressive defence of Pakistan's borders and interests against archrival India, with the defence of the majority's right to be a majority.

Ethnic nationalist parties include the Awami National Party, which is closely identified with the creation of a Pashtun-majority state in North-West Frontier Province and the Federally Administered Tribal Areas includes many Pashtun leaders in its organization. However, the Awami National Party, At the last legislative elections, 20 October 2002, won a meagre 1.0% of the popular vote and no seats in the lower house of Parliament. In Balochistan, the Balochistan National Party uses the legacy of the independent Balochistan to stir up support, However at the legislative elections, 20 October 2002, the party won only 0.2% of the popular vote and 1 out of 272 elected members.

Almost every Pakistani state has a regional party devoted solely to the culture of the native people. Unlike the Awami National party and the Balochistan national party, these mostly cannot be called nationalist, as they use regionalism as a strategy to garner votes, building on the frustration of common people with official status and the centralization of government institutions in Pakistan. However, the recent elections as well as history have shown that such ethnic nationalist parties rarely win more than 1% of the popular vote, with the overwhelming majority of votes going to large and established political parties that pursue a national agenda as opposed to regionalism.

Nuclear power

The intense guerrilla war in far Eastern Pakistan, followed by India's successful intervention led to the secession of Eastern contingent as Bangladesh. The outcomes of the war played a crucial role in the civil society. In January 1972, a clandestine crash programme and a spin-off to literary and the scientific revolution as response to that crash programme led Pakistan becoming the nuclear power.

First public tests were experimented out in 1998 (code names:Chagai-I and Chagai-II) in a direct response to India's nuclear explosions in the same year; thus Pakistan  became the 7th nation in the world to have successfully developed the programme. It is postulated that Pakistan's crash programme arose in 1970 and mass acceleration took place following the India's nuclear test in 1974. It also resulted in Pakistan pursuing similar ambitions, resulting in the May 1998 testings of five nuclear devices by India and six as a response by Pakistan, opening a new era in their rivalry. Pakistan, along with Israel and India, is three of the original states that have restrained itself from being party of the NPT and CTBT  which it considers an encroachment on its right to defend itself. To date, Pakistan is the only Muslim nuclear state.

See also
 Muslim nationalism in South Asia
 Dil Dil Pakistan
 Pakistan Zindabad
 Politics of Pakistan

References

Further reading 
 
 
 
 
 
 
 
 
 

 
Political movements in Pakistan
Islamic nationalism